Charles R. Gessner   (1863–1922), is a former professional baseball player who played pitcher in the Major Leagues for the 1886 Philadelphia Athletics of the American Association.

External links

1863 births
1922 deaths
Major League Baseball pitchers
Baseball players from Pennsylvania
19th-century baseball players
Philadelphia Athletics (AA) players
Willimantic (minor league baseball) players
Meriden Maroons players
Mt. Carmel (minor league baseball) players
Hazleton Pugilists players
Davenport Hawkeyes players
Monmouth (minor league baseball) players